Zee Cine Awards 2012 was held at the CotaiArena in Macao.

Sponsors
Pan Bahar Zee Cine Awards

Awards
The official Winners are listed Below.

Viewer's choice

Jury's choice

Technical Awards

See also
 Zee Cine Awards
 Bollywood
 Cinema of India

References

Zee Cine Awards
2012 in Macau
2012 Indian film awards

de:Zee Cine Award/Bester Liedtext